Conventional Weapons is a compilation album by American rock band My Chemical Romance, produced by Brendan O'Brien and released as a series of singles between October 2012 and February 2013. It marked the band's final release of studio material before their break-up from 2013–2019.

Background 
On September 14, 2012, Frank Iero announced the project through the band's official website. The album consists of ten unreleased songs that were recorded in 2009, prior to the making of the band's fourth studio album, Danger Days: The True Lives of the Fabulous Killjoys.

Release 
Conventional Weapons was released as a series of five colored double A-side singles accompanied by digital downloads. Each release was made available for individual purchase, but all five were also offered collectively as part of a limited-edition box set available for pre-order through the official My Chemical Romance online store. The 7-inch vinyl singles were packaged in five different picture sleeves each depicting a different type of weapon. The final single, Number Five, was shipped along with a box to house all five individual releases, along with an exclusive poster. All singles were pressed in a different color of vinyl.

Track listing

Personnel 
Band
 Bob Bryar – drums
 Frank Iero – guitars, backing vocals
 Ray Toro – guitars, backing vocals
 Gerard Way – lead vocals
 Mikey Way – bass guitar

Additional
 Rich Costey – audio mixing
 Brendan O'Brien – production
 Matt "Varnish" Taylor – art and design

References

External links 
 Official website of the band

My Chemical Romance compilation albums
Reprise Records compilation albums
2013 compilation albums
Albums produced by Brendan O'Brien (record producer)